Paul Joseph Dolan (born July 7, 1958 in Chardon, Ohio), is an attorney and Major League Baseball (MLB) team executive who is currently part-owner, chairman, and chief executive officer (CEO) of the Cleveland Guardians.  Dolan is also the "control person" for the team.

Early life
Dolan was born and raised in the Cleveland, Ohio suburb of Chardon, as one of six children of Larry and Eva Dolan.  Dolan attended high school at the Gilmour Academy in Gates Mills, Ohio, and upon graduation attended college at St. Lawrence University, and upon graduation went on to earn his Juris Doctor at Notre Dame Law School in 1983.

Career
After graduating from law school, Dolan was hired as an attorney for his father's law firm (Thrasher, Dinsmore, and Dolan), eventually becoming a partner in 1992.

In 2000, Larry Dolan purchased the Cleveland Guardians baseball team.  Upon his father taking control of the team, Dolan was hired as a vice president and general counsel.  In 2004, Dolan was promoted to team president, and in 2011 promoted again to chairman/CEO.

In 2013, Dolan was approved by the team owners of MLB as the "control person" of the Guardians; the Associated Press describes this new role as "controlling owner". This new designation means that Dolan oversees the day to day team operations, and is responsible for compliance with MLB rules and regulations.

Though officially listed as Chairman/CEO by the team, Dolan is sometimes referred to as an owner of the Guardians, as the team is considered to be a family asset due to being purchased through various Dolan Family trusts.

Family
Dolan's son Peter was selected by the Guardians in the 33rd round of the 2014 MLB Draft as a third baseman out of Gilmour Academy.  His brother Matt is a state senator in Ohio, and his cousin James is owner of the New York Knicks of the  National Basketball Association (NBA), and the New York Rangers of the National Hockey League (NHL).

Awards and honors
(as a member of the Indians/Guardians ownership and front office)
 American League champion (2016)
 6× American League Central division champion (2001, 2007, 2016, 2017, 2018, 2022)

References

External links
Interview of Paul Dolan conducted by Dan Coughlin at Cleveland Public Library on February 24, 2016. (audio only)
Guardians official website

Cleveland Indians executives
Living people
1958 births
People from Chardon, Ohio
Dolan family
Major League Baseball team presidents
American chief executives of professional sports organizations